Hugh Rice could refer to: 

Tom Rice (Hugh Thompson Rice Jr., born 1957), American politician
Hugh Rice (astronomer), American museum director and amateur astronomer for whom the asteroid 1230 Riceia is named